San Francisco City Football Club, commonly abbreviated to SF City, is a supporter-owned soccer club located in San Francisco, California that competes in USL League Two.

Founded in 2001, SF City plays its home matches at Kezar Stadium. The club has also hosted home matches at Negoesco Stadium and Cox Stadium.

SF City has qualified in 2016 and 2018 for the U.S. Open Cup, the oldest ongoing national soccer competition in the United States.

History

San Francisco City Football Club was founded in 2001 by Jonathan Wright. The club entered the San Francisco Soccer Football League beginning with the 2002 season. After a decade in the competition, the club won back-to-back promotions to reach the SFSFL Premier Division in 2012. On the heels of the club's SFSFL success, and with enthusiasm for soccer mounting in the buildup to the 2014 FIFA World Cup, former SF City player and current club president Jacques Pelham began discussions with members of the San Francisco Football Supporters Association and the San Francisco chapter of The American Outlaws about building a grassroots, supporter-owned professional soccer club in the city.

The club began offering membership in August 2014, but a bid to join the National Premier Soccer League (NPSL) for the spring 2015 campaign was blocked by San Francisco Stompers FC, who claimed territorial exclusivity in the league. SF City filed a grievance with US Soccer contesting the Stompers' claim. An independent arbiter eventually sided with SF City, but by the time the decision was made the club had already agreed to join US Club Soccer's NorCal Premier Soccer League.

In early 2015, with administration staff in place and membership on the rise, SF City approached dominant NorCal Premier Soccer League side Ticket Arsenal FC about merging its on-pitch talent, which included many former NCAA Division 1 players and some former Major League Soccer prospects, with SF City's organizational and supporter infrastructure. The merger was executed on the eve of the semifinal of the regional US Open Cup qualifying tournament.

The new-look SF City went on to qualify for the opening round of the US Open Cup. They became the first team from San Francisco to qualify for the competition since the 2007 California Victory, and the first amateur San Francisco side to do so since the reintroduction of professional clubs to the tournament in 1995. The April 25 play-in match between SF City and Cal FC set a US Open Cup preliminary round attendance record, with 1,519 spectators in the stands of the newly refurbished Kezar Stadium.

At the start of the 2016 season, SF City made their debut in the USL's Premier Development League. The club won six and drew two of their fourteen matches in that inaugural season, finishing third in the five-team Central Pacific Division.

For 2017, the club realigned to the Southwest Division. Eight wins and one draw put SF City in third place out of nine teams, just missing qualification for the playoffs.

In 2018, the team entered their second US Open Cup following their strong showing the previous season. At Raimondi Park in Oakland, SF City defeated CD Aguiluchos 4-0 to advance to the second round, where they fell to the USL Championship's Sacramento Republic. The PDL season was uneven, as the team finished sixth in the tightly contested Southwest.

In 2019, the PDL was renamed USL League Two and the Southwest Division shrank to eight teams. SF City finished in sixth place for the second consecutive season.

SF City, in conjunction with the rest of the division, canceled their 2020 season due to the COVID-19 pandemic. The club instead focused on engaging their fans and supporting charitable causes online. In 2021, the League Two campaign was again called off, leading the club to call greater attention to their team in the SFSFL. That team won ten of their eleven matches to finish atop the Majors Division and earn promotion to the Premier Division in 2022.

Year-by-year

Ownership and operations
SF City is a 51% supporter-owned club, with members paying annual dues in return for home match season tickets, club merchandise (such as the yearly scarf), and voting rights in club matters, including the election of its Members Board of Directors. Club president and CEO Jacques Pelham represents club operations on the Executive Board, Joachim Steinberg chairs the Members Board of Directors, and András Petery represents the club's investors. Charles Wollin is the team's broadcaster, providing live commentary on matches when they are streamed online.

In 2016, SF City announced a new round of minority investors:

 Alex Bard, CEO at Campaign Monitor, previously EVP at Salesforce
 Mitch Lowe, angel investor and advisor, previously co-founder and COO at Redbox
 Gary Benitt, General Partner at Social Leverage, previously co-founder and COO at Desk.com
 Ethan Kurzweil, partner at Bessemer Venture Partners
 Scot Chisholm, CEO and co-founder at Classy
 Andy Jones, a fifteen-year veteran in the financial services industry
 Andrew Housser, co-founder and co-CEO of Freedom Financial Network
 András Petery, a mobile tech media executive and investor who led mobile partnerships at Yahoo! and founded Enable Venture Partners

Supporters
The supporters of SF City are known collectively as "El Lado Norte" or "The Northsiders," as they gather in the north stand at Kezar Stadium during matches. In addition to standing, singing, chanting, waving flags, and displaying tifos during matches, Northsiders frequently gather to socialize, attend or watch away matches, and perform community service. The Northsiders took Supporters Group of the Year honors at USL League Two's Golden Scarf Awards in 2019, and propelled SF City to the title in the league's Fan-Voted Season in 2020.

Kit sponsors

References

External links
Official Site

City
2001 establishments in California
Association football clubs established in 2001
USL League Two teams